Song Zuying (born August 13, 1966) is a Chinese classical/folk singer.

Early life

Song was born in Guzhang County, part of Xiangxi Tujia and Miao Autonomous Prefecture, Hunan. She is of Miao ethnicity, and studied at the Department of Music and Dancing at the Central Institute for Nationalities in Beijing, after which she studied at the China Music College. Her father died when she was 12, and she is the oldest daughter. In 1991, she joined the Chinese People's Liberation Army Naval Song and Dance Troupe as a national first-class singer.

Political activities
Song joined the Chinese Communist Party in 1999 when it was led by Party General Secretary Jiang Zemin, with whom she is rumoured to have had an affair. Zeng Qinghuai, brother of Zeng Qinghong, a key political advisor to Jiang Zemin, is also believed to have been her "key patron". She rose quickly to become a deputy representative at the 9th National People's Congress from 1998 to 2003, and a member of the 10th, 11th, and 12th Chinese People's Political Consultative Conference, from 2003 on. She is a standing member of the Communist Youth League of China, an executive member of All-China Women's Federation, a member of China Federation of Literary and Art Circles and the agent of China Musician Association. She is also an ambassador to the Chinese Red Cross

Military
As of 2009, she is a non-combatant Rear Admiral in the People's Liberation Army Navy.

Investigation for corruption
In January 2018 it was reported that Song was under investigation for corruption as part of Party General Secretary Xi Jinping's anti-corruption campaign in connection to an alleged misuse of public funds in the financing of her personal musical concerts in 2002, 2003, and in 2006. During this time, other former Jiang Zemin loyalists were targeted by investigations, including her former patron Zeng Qinghuai, and Song's brother, Song Zuyu. 

In February 2018 Song's name was removed from the list of attendees of the CPPCC.

Discography
 Song Zuying & China Philharmonic Orchestra: Epics Of Love - An Anthology of Ancient Chinese Poetry (Stockfisch, 2015)

Filmography
Wan-chun (1990)

References

External links
Famous Chinese Folk Singer - Song Zuying
宋祖英登台开唱风靡小巨蛋 
宋祖英尬雙周 巨蛋夜瘋狂 2011年05月09日 

1966 births
Living people
Chinese women singers
Chinese folk singers
Chinese sopranos
People from Xiangxi
Minzu University of China alumni
Singers from Hunan
Stockfisch Records artists
Members of the 12th Chinese People's Political Consultative Conference
Delegates to the 9th National People's Congress